Jim McNeely (born May 18, 1949) is a jazz pianist, composer, arranger and faculty.

Biography 
Jim McNeely was born in Chicago, Illinois. He earned a Bachelor of Music degree from the University of Illinois, and moved to New York City in 1975. In 1978, he joined the Thad Jones/Mel Lewis Big Band. He spent six years as a featured soloist with that band and its successor, Mel Lewis and the Jazz Orchestra (now the Vanguard Jazz Orchestra).

In 1981, he began a four-year tenure as pianist/composer with the Stan Getz Quartet. From 1990 until 1995, he was the pianist in the Phil Woods Quintet. In 1996, he re-joined the Vanguard Jazz Orchestra as pianist. He is still associated with the Vanguard Orchestra as composer-in-residence.

From 1998 to 2002, McNeely was chief conductor of the DR Big Band in Copenhagen, Denmark.
, he was chief conductor of the HR (Hessischer Rundfunk) Big Band in Frankfurt, Germany. He is currently their Composer-in-Residence. He has appeared as guest with many of Europe's leading jazz orchestras such as the Jazz Orchestra of the Concertgebouw (the Netherlands), the WDR Big Band (Cologne, Germany), the Stockholm Jazz Orchestra (Sweden) and the Swiss Jazz Orchestra. McNeely also leads his own tentet, his own trio, and appears as soloist at concerts and festivals worldwide. He has recorded more than 20 albums as leader, receiving twelve Grammy nominations between 1997 and 2019.

As part of the Vanguard Jazz Orchestra, he received a Grammy Award for the album Monday Night Live at the Village Vanguard in 2008.

McNeely is professor emeritus at Manhattan School of Music, and is former musical director of the BMI Jazz Composers Workshop.

A former resident of Montclair, New Jersey, and Maplewood, New Jersey he now resides in Owls Head, Maine .

Selected discography
As leader
 Rain's Dance, (SteepleChase, 1976)
 The Plot Thickens, (Muse, 1979)
 From the Heart, (Owl, 1984)
 Winds of Change, (SteepleChase, 1989)
 East Coast Blow Out (w/WDR Big Band), (Lipstick, 1989)
 Jigsaw (w/Stockholm Jazz Orch.), (Dragon, 1991)
 Jim McNeely at Maybeck, (Concord, 1992)
 Sound Bites (w/Stockholm Jazz Orch.), (Dragon, 1997)
 Lickety Split (w/Vanguard Jazz Orch.), (New World, 1997)
 Nice Work (w/Danish Radio Big Band), (Dacapo, 2000) – recorded in 1998
 Group Therapy (Jim McNeely Tentet), (OmniTone, 2001)
 The Power and the Glory: A salute to Louis Armstrong (w/Danish Radio Big Band, feat. Leroy Jones), (Storyville, 2001)
 Play Bill Evans (w/Danish Radio Big Band), (Stunt, 2002)
 In This Moment (w/Adam Nussbaum, Lennart Ginman), (Stunt, 2003)
 Up From the Skies (w/Vanguard Jazz Orch.), (Planet Arts, 2006)
 Dedication Suite (w/Danish Radio Big Band), (Cope, 2006) – recorded in 2002
 Paul Klee (w/Swiss Jazz Orch.), (Mons, 2006)
 Boneyard (w/Kelly Sill, Joel Spencer), (Origin, 2006)
 Remember the Sound (w/George Robert Jazztet), (TCB, 2008)
 A Single Sky (w/Dave Douglas & Frankfurt Radio Big Band), (Greenleaf, 2009)
 Quest for Freedom (w/David Liebman, Richie Beirach & Frankfurt Radio Big Band), (Sunnyside, 2010)
 Barefoot Dances and Other Visions (w/Frankfurt Radio Big Band), (Planet Arts, 2018)
 Rituals (Frankfurt Radio Big Band and Chris Potter), (Double Moon Records, 2022)
 Threnody (Jazz Orchestra of the Concertgebouw), (Challenge Records, 2022)

With Ted Curson
 Blue Piccolo (Whynot, 1976)
 Jubilant Power (Inner City, 1976)
 I Heard Mingus (Interplay, 1980)
 Snake Johnson (Chiaroscuro, 1981)

With Stan Getz
 Blue Skies (Concord Jazz, 1982 [1995])
 Pure Getz (Concord Jazz, 1982)
 Stan Getz Quartet Live in Paris (Dreyfus, 1982 [1996])
 Line for Lyons (Sonet, 1983) with Chet Baker
 The Stockholm Concert (Sonet, 1983 [1989])

With Mel Lewis
Mellifluous (Gatemouth, 1981)
 With Phil Woods."Flowers fort Hodges". (1991)

References

External links
The Official Jim McNeely Website
The Vanguard Jazz Orchestra
 The HR Big Band
Study scores by Jim McNeely
Jim McNeely interview by Ronan Guilfoyle
Jim McNeely interview by Ethan Iverson

1949 births
Living people
American jazz composers
American male jazz composers
American jazz pianists
American male pianists
American jazz bandleaders
People from Montclair, New Jersey
SteepleChase Records artists
Muse Records artists
Concord Records artists
20th-century American pianists
DR Big Band members
21st-century American pianists
20th-century American male musicians
21st-century American male musicians